( in the masthead; ; Norwegian for "The Evening Post") is Norway's largest printed newspaper by circulation. It is based in Oslo. It sold 211,769 copies in 2015 (172,029 printed copies according to University of Bergen) and estimated 1.2 million readers. It converted from broadsheet to compact format in March 2005. Aftenpostens online edition is at Aftenposten.no.  It is considered a newspaper of record for Norway.

Aftenposten is a private company wholly owned by the public company Schibsted ASA. Norway's second largest newspaper, VG, is also owned by Schibsted. Norwegian owners held a 42% of the shares in Schibsted at the end of 2015. 

The paper has around 740 employees. Trine Eilertsen was appointed editor-in-chief in 2020.

History and profile
Aftenposten was founded by Christian Schibsted on 14 May 1860 under the name Christiania Adresseblad. The following year, it was renamed Aftenposten. Since 1885, the paper has printed two daily editions. A Sunday edition was published until 1919, and was reintroduced in 1990. The Friday-morning edition carries the A-magasinet supplement, featuring articles on science, politics, and the arts. In 1886, Aftenposten bought a rotary press, being the first Norwegian newspaper in this regard.

Historically, Aftenposten labelled itself as "independent, conservative", most closely aligning their editorial platform with the Norwegian Conservative Party. This manifested itself in blunt anticommunism during the interwar era. During World War II, Aftenposten, due to its large circulation, was put under the directives of the German occupational authorities, and a Nazi editorial management was imposed. Its editor-in-chief was H. Nesse at that time, and he was arrested and imprisoned in Grini concentration camp.

Aftenposten is based in Oslo. In the late 1980s, Egil Sundar served as the editor-in-chief and attempted to transform the paper into a nationally distributed newspaper. However, he was forced to resign from his post due to his attempt.

Editions
In addition to the morning edition, Aftenposten published a separate evening edition called Aften (previously Aftenposten Aften). This edition was published on weekdays and Saturdays until the Sunday morning edition was reintroduced in 1990. The evening edition was only circulated in the central eastern part of Norway, i.e. Oslo and Akershus counties. Thus, it focused on news related to this area, in contrast with the morning edition, which focuses on national and international news. The evening edition was converted to tabloid format in 1997. From April 2006, the Thursday edition of Aften also included a special edition with news specific to a part of Oslo or Akershus, called Lokal Aften ("Local Evening"). This edition had eight versions, with each subscriber receiving the version which is most relevant to the area in which he or she lives. In areas not covered by any of the eight versions (for example Romerike and Follo), the version for central Oslo was distributed. From May 2009, Aften was only printed and distributed Tuesday through Thursday. The publication of Aften ended on 20 December 2012.

Aftenposten started its online edition in 1995.

Controversies
Aftenposten opposed the award of the Nobel Peace Prize to German pacifist Carl von Ossietzky in 1935.

In 1945, Aftenposten published an obituary of Adolf Hitler in which the 86-year-old Nobel-laureate novelist Knut Hamsun referred to Hitler as "a warrior for humankind and a preacher of the gospel of justice for all nations". At that time, Aftenposten was under the censorship of the German occupying forces.

Historically, Aftenposten has not received the same number of lawsuits or as much attention from the Norwegian Press Complaints Commission as some of the larger tabloids. However, there are exceptions. In 2007, Aftenposten alleged that Julia Svetlichnaya, the last person to interview the murdered Russian national Alexander Litvinenko, was a Kremlin agent. London correspondent Hilde Harbo admitted having allowed herself to be fed disinformation emanating from the Russian emigrant community without investigating the matter properly. Aftenposten eventually had to apologize and pay Svetlichnaya's legal costs.

In 2011 the newspaper was criticized by Jon Hustad for publishing conspiracy theories that promoted the false claim that convicted Soviet spy Arne Treholt was innocent, based entirely on a book by convicted fraudster Geir Selvik Malthe-Sørenssen that was revealed to be based on a fabricated source. In a study dated 2016 Aftenposten was found to contain the epithet Negro (Norwegian: neger) at the highest frequency in the period between 1970 and 2014 with 674 references. In 2021 the paper was criticized by the youth organization of the National Association for Lesbians, Gays, Bisexuals and Transgender People for allegedly publishing articles that promoted transphobic conspiracy theories about trans women.

Editorial line
Aftenposten had a conservative stance and supported the political party Høyre until the breakdown of party press system in the country. Following this, the paper positioned itself as an independent centre-right newspaper.

Language
From its establishment in 1860 until 1923, Aftenposten was published in the common Dano-Norwegian written language used in both Norway and Denmark, which was generally known as Danish in Denmark and as Norwegian in Norway, and which only occasionally included minor differences from each other in vocabulary or idiom. In 1923 Aftenposten adopted the Norwegian spelling standard of 1907, which mainly replaced the "soft" consonants (e.g. d, b) characteristic of Danish pronunciation (but also used in some Norwegian dialects) with "hard" consonants (e.g. t, p) characteristic of Eastern Central Norwegian pronunciation, but which was otherwise mostly identical with Danish.  In 1928 Aftenposten adopted the most conservative variant of the spelling standard of 1917, which is largely similar to the "moderate Bokmål" or "Riksmål" standard used today.

During the Norwegian language struggle from the early 1950s, Aftenposten was the main newspaper of the Riksmål variety of Norwegian, and maintained close ties to the Riksmål movement's institutions, recognising the Norwegian Academy for Language and Literature as the sole authoritative body for regulating the Norwegian language as used by the newspaper. Due to its status as the country's largest and most influential newspaper, Aftenposten therefore had a significant influence on the developments that took place during the Norwegian language struggle. The "moderate" or "conservative" Riksmål language used by Aftenposten was mainly associated with a conservative stance in Norwegian politics, and was contrasted with the "radical" Samnorsk language, an attempt to merge Bokmål with Nynorsk which was promoted by socialist governments in the 1950s. By 1960 it had become apparent that the Samnorsk attempt had failed, and as a result, Aftenposten's Riksmål standard and the government-promoted Bokmål standard have in the following decades become almost identical as the Bokmål standard has incorporated nearly all of Riksmål. As a consequence, Aftenposten decided to describe its language as "Moderate Bokmål" from 2006, and published its own dictionary, based on Riksmål and Moderate Bokmål, but excluding "radical" (i.e. similar to Nynorsk) variants of Bokmål.

The online version of the paper for some years during the early 2000s had an English section. To cut costs, Aftenposten stopped publishing English-language articles in early November 2008. Archives of past material are still available online.

Circulation

Aftenposten (morning paper)

Numbers from the Norwegian Media Businesses' Association, Mediebedriftenes Landsforening 1980–2009:

 1980: 223,925
 1981: 227,122
 1982: 230,205
 1983: 232,459
 1984: 233,998
 1985: 240,600
 1986: 252,093
 1987: 260,915
 1988: 264,469
 1989: 267,278
 1990: 265,558
 1991: 269,278
 1992: 274,870
 1993: 278,669
 1994: 279,965
 1995: 282,018
 1996: 283,915
 1997: 286,163
 1998: 288,078
 1999: 284,251
 2000: 276,429
 2001: 262,632
 2002: 263,026
 2003: 256,639
 2004: 249,861
 2005: 252,716
 2006: 248,503
 2007: 250,179
 2008: 247,556
 2009: 243,188
 2010: 239,831
 2011: 235,795
 2012: 225,981
 2013: 214,026
 2014: 221,659
 2015: 211,769

Aften (evening paper) - now defunct
Numbers from the Norwegian Media Businesses' Association, Mediebedriftenes Landsforening: 1989–2009:

 1939: 78,700
 —
 —
 —
 —
 —
 —
 —
 —
 1989: 193,932
 1990: 192,896
 1991: 195,022
 1992: 197,738
 1993: 198,647
 1994: 188,544
 1995: 186,003
 1996: 188,635
 1997: 191,269
 1998: 186,417
 1999: 180,497
 2000: 175,783
 2001: 167,671
 2002: 163,924
 2003: 155,366
 2004: 148,067
 2005: 141,612
 2006: 137,141
 2007: 131,089
 2008: 124,807
 2009: 111,566

Aftenposten.no, online newspaper
The online newspaper Aftenposten.no had an average of 827,000 daily readers in 2015, an increase from 620.000 in 2010.

See also
 List of Norwegian newspapers
 List of non-English newspapers with English language subsections
 Radio Gaga

References

Further reading
 Merrill, John C. and Harold A. Fisher. The world's great dailies: profiles of fifty newspapers (1980) pp 37–43

External links

  

1860 establishments in Norway
Newspapers published in Oslo
Norwegian-language newspapers
Newspapers established in 1860
Daily newspapers published in Norway
Norwegian news websites